The Jiashi earthquakes were a series of earthquakes from 1997 to 2003, with several earthquakes larger than  6 occurring between January and April, 1997. Two strong earthquakes with magnitudes  6.4 and 6.3 occurred on January 21, 1997, at 09:47 and 09:48 local time, respectively, in Jiashi County of Xinjiang Autonomous Region, NW China. The earthquakes occurred on a major strike-slip fault beneath the Tarim Basin. The fault has no surface expression and prior to the earthquake was unknown. At least 12 people were killed and 40 injured in the earthquakes of January 21. Another earthquake on March 1, 1997, at 14:04 local time with magnitude  6.0 killed another person. On April 6, 11 and 16, other four earthquakes with magnitudes  6.3, 6.4, 6.6 and 6.3 killed 8 people. Several predictions were made in this earthquake series. Some of the predictions were not fulfilled, while some preceded the predicted earthquake from 2.5 hours to 4 days. The April 11 earthquake occurred 30 minutes after a prediction was made. Rebiya Kadeer wrote that her career was significantly affected by the earthquakes, which were "one of the worst natural disasters that had occurred in the Uyghur nation in recent memory." One hundred villages and one thousand homes were leveled. Kadeer organized donations and aid for the area.

See also
List of earthquakes in China

References

External links

1997 Jiashi
1997 earthquakes
1997 disasters in China
January 1997 events in Asia